The Babcock Lakes were a series of water ponds formerly located near the Washington Monument in Washington, D.C., before the area became the National Mall. In 1878, they were designated as fisheries by the United States Fish Commission, in an effort to increase availability of commercial fish in America. While extant, the lakes played a key role in introducing carp into the United States. By 1896, some 2.4 million carp had been distributed from the lakes to restock fish supplies in both North and South America.

By 1911, the lakes had been covered by land dredged from the Potomac River in the expansion of West Potomac Park.

References

Further reading

External links
CarpAnglersGroup.com (replacement source) detailing the introduction of carp into the U.S.

History of Washington, D.C.
Lakes of Washington, D.C.